The Ultimate History of Video Games is a 2001 non-fiction book by Steven L. Kent. Published initially by Prima Publishing and then by Three Rivers Press, it is an updated version of the self-published The First Quarter: A 25-Year History of Video Games.

Development 
The book was constructed primarily from over 500 interviews, with industry figures granting multiple conversations. Three potential sources declined. He had originally intended to release the book in 1995, and then in 1996, but then he "finally published the damned thing" independently in 2000. 5,000 copies of this first edition were quickly sold exclusively through Amazon, and then Prima Publishing bought the rights. Kent initially opposed referring to the new edition as "ultimate". An index was added. He bemoaned that the Three Rivers Press edition was released before the launches of the GameCube and Xbox. In 2018, and again in 2019, he mentioned that he was working on a second volume, which was eventually published in August 2021 and titled “The Ultimate History Of Video Games, Vol. 2” .

Reception 
Ken Gagne of Gamebits, reviewing The First Quarter: A 25-Year History of Video Games, said it suffered frequent typos and disliked that Kent largely withheld his own opinion. However, LudoScience called it "an absolute must-read for anyone interested in the history of video games".

Nintendo Life said that the 2001 rerelease as The Ultimate History of Video Games was Kent's "seminal work". Publishers Weekly noted Kent's "infectious enthusiasm" and called the book "a loving tribute" to the videogame industry. Tim Rotertson at MyMac.com called Kent a "gifted writer" and gave the book a 5/5 rating, but suggested that it should have been multiple volumes for more depth.

References 

Ultimate
Ultimate
Three Rivers Press books